The Lake Agnes Cabin, located 2.5 miles from State Highway 14 near Cameron Pass, near Gould, Colorado, was built in 1925.  It was listed on the National Register of Historic Places in 2007.

It was used seasonally by park rangers during 1925–2000, and also as a rental cabin years leading up to 2000, and since has been closed.

It was deemed significant "as a good local example of Rustic style architecture. Rustic style architecture is characterized by its natural setting and its use of native materials, most often log and stone. Designed to blend in with the natural environment, these structures are usually vacation homes, hunting lodges, dude ranches, tourism-related buildings or administrative facilities in national and state parks. The Lake Agnes Cabin reflects the design characteristics with its simple form, log walls, rubble foundation, gently pitched roof with wood shingles, and its exposed log interior."

References 

Houses completed in 1925
Houses on the National Register of Historic Places in Colorado
Buildings and structures in Jackson County, Colorado
Log cabins in the United States
Rustic architecture in Colorado
National Register of Historic Places in Jackson County, Colorado
Log buildings and structures on the National Register of Historic Places in Colorado
1925 establishments in Colorado